Cerium(IV) perchlorate is an inorganic compound composed of cerium and perchloric acid. It has the chemical formula of Ce(ClO4)4.

Uses 
Cerium(IV) perchlorate is used as a catalyst in organic chemistry for the determination of strontium and for cerimetry. It has a very high redox potential at Ce4+/Ce3+ of +1.87 V in 8 M HClO4.

References 

Cerium compounds
Perchlorates